Steven Umoh, known by his stage name Obongjayar, is a Nigerian musical artist based in London. After releasing multiple EPs, his debut studio album, Some Nights I Dream of Doors, was released in 2022.

Early life 
Steven Umoh grew up in Calabar, Nigeria. He was raised by his grandmother; his mother had moved to the UK to escape Umoh's father, who was abusive. Early in his life, Umoh primarily listened to bootleg rap, particularly Eminem, Usher, Nelly, Snoop Dogg and Ciara.

Umoh moved to live with his mother in England at the age of 17, but stayed active in the Nigerian music scene. He grew up a devoutly religious Christian, but became less so after he attended university in Norwich. In college he sang primarily in an American accent, influenced by his childhood spent listening to American hip hop music, but he transitioned to singing in his natural Nigerian-British accent before embarking on his professional career.

Career 
Obongjayar started his career publishing his music on SoundCloud. His work caught the notice of XL Recordings executive Richard Russell, who then asked Obongjayar to contribute to his Everything Is Recorded project. In 2016, Obongjayar released his first extended play, Home, described by Noisey as "a unique voice: one that navigates darkness with nocturnal, near-spiritual hymns."

He followed Home with a second EP, Bassey, which was noted for its sparse production and afrobeat rhythms, as well as its themes of spirituality, politics, and his experiences as a Black person. He also contributed to Richard Russell's 2017 EP, Close But Not Quite.

In 2019, Obongjayar featured on Detroit rapper Danny Brown's fifth studio album U Know What I'm Sayin? on the tracks "Belly of the Beast" and "uknowhatimsayin¿".

In collaboration with afrobeat producer Sarz, Obongjayar released a third EP, Sweetness, in 2021. He featured on rapper Little Simz's studio album Sometimes I Might Be Introvert on the fourth single "Point and Kill", which was later accompanied by a music video. Obongjayar also released the song and music video "Message in a Hammer", the lead single for his debut album. Some Nights I Dream of Doors was released in May 2022.

Style 
Obongjayar's music has been called "hard to describe", incorporating elements of afrobeat, spoken word, soul, and electronic music. His lyrics incorporate spiritual overtones, although they are not readily identifiable with any specific religious tradition. A unifying feature of all of Obongjayar's music is his unique voice, which slides between rapping, singing, and spoken word.

Discography

Studio albums 
Some Nights I Dream of Doors (2022)

EPs 
Home (2016)
Bassey (2017)
Which Way is Forward (2020)
Sweetness (2021)

References

External links
 Latest releases (Soundcloud)
 Instagram

Living people
Afrobeat musicians
British male musicians
British people of Nigerian descent
Nigerian male musicians
People from Calabar
Year of birth missing (living people)
Nigerian alté singers